Margaret Courtenay (14 November 1923 – 15 February 1996) was a British actress best known for her British theatre roles during the 1970s and 1980s. She was a member of the Royal Shakespeare Company.

In 1976, Courtenay won the Laurence Olivier Award for Supporting Artist of the Year for her stage role in the play Separate Tables, by author Terence Rattigan, directed by Michael Blakemore, at the Apollo Theatre in London's West End.

Courtenay retired at Denville Hall, a retirement home for professional actors set in Northwood in the London Borough of Hillingdon. She died of cancer on 15 February 1996 at age 72.

Stage work

Filmography

Film

Television

References

External links 

 
 

1923 births
Actresses from Cardiff
British musical theatre actresses
Welsh stage actresses
Welsh film actresses
British stage actresses
British film actresses
British television actresses
20th-century British actresses
20th-century Welsh women singers
Royal Shakespeare Company members
Alumni of the London Academy of Music and Dramatic Art
Laurence Olivier Award winners
1996 deaths